We're No Angels is a 1989 American comedy film directed by Neil Jordan. A remake of the 1955 film of the same name, the film stars Robert De Niro, Sean Penn, and Demi Moore. It received mixed reviews and grossed $10.5 million on a $20 million budget.

Plot
A couple of 1930s Great Depression-era convicts, Ned and Jim, jailed on never-specified charges and abused by a ruthless warden, are dragged along when a vicious killer named Bobby escapes the electric chair.

The two end up in a small upstate New York town near the Canada–US border, where they are mistaken for a pair of priests expected at the local monastery. They want to flee but cannot, since misunderstandings and the warden's search party looking for Bobby make a trip across the bridge to Canada almost impossible.

Ned and Jim continue to masquerade as priests, trusted and welcomed by Father Levesque. An opportunity presents itself in the form of a procession to the church's sister church across the border. Each priest participating has to bring along someone who needs help, so they decide on the deaf-mute daughter of Molly, a local laundress and prostitute.

Bobby is killed by police during the procession. Ned saves Molly's daughter from drowning, after this event she is able to speak. Jim is befriended by a young monk and decides to stay in the monastery to actually become a priest. Ned takes Molly and her daughter to Canada.

Cast

Production
The project seemed like it could not fail: wrote A.J. Black, Robert De Niro and Sean Penn were "a bankable duo who Paramount would have been unconcerned about throwing a significant budget toward, produced by an impresario with proven hits at his back, written by a celebrated wordsmith and helmed by an acclaimed young director breaking into the studio system." Screenwriter David Mamet took the initial premise from the 1955 movie of the same name, but he created a new scenario. Though the story is set in upstate New York, it was filmed in Mission, British Columbia. The set design involved the creation of an entire riverside town, with a budget of CDN $2.5 million for the set alone being the largest for a film produced in Canada to that date.

Reception
The film gained mixed reviews. Rotten Tomatoes sampled 19 reviewers and judged 47% of the reviews to be positive, with an average score of 5. Audiences surveyed by CinemaScore gave the film a grade "B-" on scale of A to F.

Roger Ebert liked the film, saying "Robert De Niro and Sean Penn have two of the best faces in the movies - screwed up, sideways faces with a lot of mischief in the eyes. We're No Angels is a movie made for those faces, and one of the pleasures of watching the film is to see them looking sidelong at each other as they try to figure a way out of the complicated mess they're in." In a retrospective review from 2019, critic John Hansen wrote "We’re No Angels was probably hurt by being unappealing on the surface to both religious and non-religious moviegoers, with both groups assuming the film isn’t for them. But it’s actually for anyone who enjoys a smartly crafted comedy."

Box office

The film debuted at #8 at the United States box office. It was similarly unsuccessful on home video.

See also
 Romans (2013), an Indian Malayalam language comedy thriller, written by YV Rajesh.
 The Lizard (2004), an Iranian comedy drama film directed by Kamal Tabrizi.

References

External links
 
 

1989 films
1980s buddy comedy films
1980s crime comedy films
American buddy comedy films
American chase films
American crime comedy films
1980s English-language films
Films about friendship
Films about religion
Films directed by Neil Jordan
Films produced by Art Linson
Films scored by George Fenton
Films set in the 1930s
Films set in the United States
Films with screenplays by David Mamet
Paramount Pictures films
1989 comedy films
Religious comedy films
1980s American films